() is a book of supplications attributed to Ali ibn Husayn Zayn al-Abidin (–713), the great-grandson of the Islamic prophet Muhammad, the fourth Twelver Shi'a Imam and the third Ismaili Shi'a Imam. A seminal work in early Islamic spirituality, the book is considered to be the oldest prayer manual in Islamic sources. Shia tradition regards the book with great respect, ranking it behind the Quran and Ali's Nahj al-Balagha. Fifty-four supplications form the main body of Al-Sahifa, which often also includes an addenda of fourteen supplications and fifteen s. Al-Sahifa is often regarded as authentic by the specialists in the science of hadith. Chittick describes the book as "one of the deepest veins of Islamic spirituality," while Husain Mohammad Jafri posits that the supplications in Al-Sahifa embody the answers to many of the spiritual questions faced by the man of our age.

About the book 
Al-Sahifa al-Sajjadiyya is a collection of supplications and whispered prayers attributed to Ali ibn al-Husayn, the great-grandson of Muhammad and the fourth Shia Imam, also known by the honorific titles al-Sajjad and Zayn al-Abidin. Shia tradition regards Al-Sahifa with great respect, ranking it behind the Quran and Ali's Nahj al-Balagha. According to Chittick, the book is known by various honorific names, including "Sister of the Quran", "Gospel of the Holy Household", and "Psalms of Muhammad's Household".

Chittick defines supplicating or calling upon God as the act of addressing Him with one's praise, thanksgiving, hopes, and needs. Muslims often recite the supplications of those already shaped by God's mercy and guidance, starting with Muhammad and, for the Shia, continuing with their Imams, who saw it as their duty to guide the Muslim community and enrich their religious life. In particular, Chittick suggests that Al-Sahifa was composed by al-Sajjad with the Muslim community in mind. To support this view, Chittick cites the supplications in Al-Sahifa for public occasions, such as Eid al-Fitr, and the supplication for parents, in which al-Sajjad speaks as if his parents were still alive.

Chittick views Al-Sahifa as a manifestation of Islamic spirituality, expressed in a universal language, that of the yearning of the soul for perfection. According to Chittick, the supplications in Al-Sahifa are the constant exercise of discerning what belongs to God and what belongs to man, after which man is left with his inadequacies and sinfulness, so he can abase himself before his Lord and ask for His generosity and forgiveness.

Predominance of mercy 
The Quran is regarded by Muslims as a window into the character of Muhammad and Chittick thus likens Al-Sahifa to a mosaic, every element of which corresponds to an element of the Quranic text and Muhammad's soul. Faced with both the mercy and wrath of God in the Quran, the constant theme of Al-Sahifa is to seek the former and avoid the latter. In this regard, Chittick writes that Al-Sahifa shows a remarkable awareness of human imperfection, where al-Sajjad repeatedly acknowledges his own inadequacies as a human being and takes refuge in the Quranic statements about the precedence of God's mercy over His wrath, as exemplified by the passage

This emphasis of Al-Sahifa on God's mercy reflects the attitude of its author: Reacting to Hasan al-Basri's statement, "It is not strange if a person as he perishes. It is only strange if a person is saved as he is saved," al-Sajjad is known to have responded that, "But I say that it is not strange if a person is saved as he is saved. It is only strange if a person perishes as he perishes, given the scope of God's mercy." Al-Sajjad's attitude is that of Muhammad here, who is reported to have said that the worshipper "should be firm and make his desire great, for what God gives is nothing great for Him." Nevertheless, the hope in God's mercy should be accompanied by "refraining from arrogance, pulling aside from persistence [in sin], and holding fast to praying [for] forgiveness," as prescribed in passage 12:13 of Al-Sahifa.

Political views 
According to Chittick, in some of the prayers in Al-Sahifa, al-Sajjad alludes to the injustice suffered by his family, Muhammad's household, and the usurpation of their heritage. There are also examples in Al-Sahifa where al-Sajjad prays for the Muslim community and the rectification of its affairs, as well as the soldiers guarding the Muslim frontiers.

It seems that Al-Sahifa, which was protected from government agents by al-Sajjad's sons and companions, was a sectarian and organisational booklet. The views in Al-Sahifa might have also contributed to the uprising against the Umayyads. Salutations to Muhammad and his family appear in most of the supplications of Al-Sahifa, against the policies of the Umayyads. In a number of supplications, al-Sajjad explains the concept of imamate, central to the Shia belief.

Other dimensions 
While the supplicatory form of Al-Sahifa emphasizes the spirituality of Islam, Chittick maintains that the book also provides a broad range of practical teachings about the faith, from theological to social. For instance, according to Chittick, among the existing works, the prayer "Blessing Upon the Bearers of the Throne" best summarizes the Islamic views about angels. The book also frequently refers to Islamic practices, emphasizing the necessity of implementing the guidelines of the Quran and the hadith literature, as well as the importance of social justice.

Authenticity 
Chittick, however, suspects that the fifteen whispered prayers in Al-Sahifa might have been artistically edited. According to Shia tradition, al-Sajjad collected his supplications and taught them to his family, particularly his sons, Muhammad al-Baqir and Zayd. These supplications over time became widely disseminated among all Shia Muslims.

Translations 
Al-Sahifa was translated into Persian during the Safavid era, and an English translation of the book, entitled The Psalms of Islam, is also available with an introduction and annotations by Chittick. Numerous commentaries have been written about Al-Sahifa.

Other collections 
Aside from Al-Sahifa, various authors have attempted to collect other supplications attributed to al-Sajjad. The second Al-Sahifa was compiled in 1053 AH (1643 CE) by al-Hurr al-Amili , a renowned Twelver Shi'i scholar. The third Al-Sahifa was collected by Afandi, a student of Majlisi. The fifth Al-Sahifa by Muhsin al-Amin, a well-known contemporary Twelver scholar, is the longest and subsumes all the supplications included in the earlier attempts.

Content 
Fifty-four supplications form the main body of Al-Sahifa, which also includes fourteen additional supplications and fifteen s. Their titles are as follows:
 Praise of God
 Blessing upon Muhammad and his Household
 Blessing upon the bearers of the Throne
 Blessing upon the attesters to the messengers
 Supplication for himself and the people under his guardianship
 Supplication in the morning and evening
 Supplication in worrisome tasks
 Supplication in seeking refuge
 Supplication in yearning
 Supplication in seeking asylum with God
 Supplication for good outcomes
 Supplication in confession
 Supplication in seeking needs [from God]
 Supplication in acts of wrongdoing
 Supplication when sick
 Supplication in asking release
 Supplication against Satan
 Supplication in perils
 Supplication in asking for water [during a drought]
 Supplication on noble moral traits
 Supplication when something made him sorrow
 Supplication in hardship
 Supplication for well-being
 Supplication for his parents
 Supplication for his children
 Supplication for his neighbors and friends
 Supplication for the people of the frontiers
 Supplication in fleeing [to God]
 Supplication when his provision was stinted
 Supplication for help in repaying debts
 Supplication in repentance
 Supplication in the night prayer
 Supplication in asking for the best
 Supplication when afflicted
 Supplication in satisfaction with the decree
 Supplication upon hearing thunder
 Supplication in giving thanks
 Supplication in asking pardon
 Supplication in seeking pardon
 Supplication when death was mentioned
 Supplication in asking for covering and protection
 Supplication upon completing a reading of the Quran
 Supplication when he looked at the new crescent moon
 Supplication for the coming of the month of Ramadan
 Supplication in bidding farewell to the month of Ramadan
 Supplication on the Day of Fast-Breaking and Friday
 Supplication on the Day of Arafa
 Supplication on the Day of Sacrifice and Friday
 Supplication in repelling the trickery of enemies
 Supplication in fear
 Supplication in pleading and abasement
 Supplication in imploring God
 Supplication in Abasing himself
 Supplication for the Removal of Worries

Addenda

His supplications for the days of the week

Fifteen whispered prayers

See also 

 List of Shia books
 Ghurar al-Hikam wa Durar al-Kalim (attributed to Ali)
 Al-Risalah al-Huquq (attributed to al-Sajjad)
 The Fifteen Whispered Prayers (attributed to al-Sajjad)
 Al-Risalah al-Dhahabiah (attributed to Ali al-Ridha)
 Al-Sahifat al-Ridha (attributed to Ali al-Ridha)
 Al-Jafr (book) (reportedly mentioned by Jafar al-Sadiq)
 Al-Jamiah (reportedly mentioned by Jafar al-Sadiq)
 Mushaf Fatimah (reportedly mentioned by Jafar al-Sadiq)

Notes

References

Sources

External links 
Sahifa-e-Sajjadia Duas in Audio, Video and PDF format
An English text translation of the Sahifa, and audio files in Arabic
Duas

Shia hadith collections
Shia prayers